Schinia angulilinea is a moth of the family Noctuidae. It is found in eastern Arizona.

The length of the fore wings is 12–14 mm for males and 11-13 for females. Adults are on wing from June to September.

External links
Nomenclatural validation of three North American species of Heliothinae

Schinia
Moths of North America
Moths described in 1996